Version One Ventures is a Vancouver-based, early-stage investment fund company founded by Boris Wertz and managed by his investing partner Angela Tran Kingyens. The company provides investments to startups, primarily in SaaS, marketplace, cryptocurrency, financial tech, and healthcare industries.

In the beginning of his company, Mr. Wertz raised his first, $18.7-million fund from outside investors in 2012.  In October of last year (2014), Version One announced the receipt of its second investment of $35 Million by Northleaf Venture Catalyst Fund and LP BDC Capital.  Up to this point, Version One Ventures has made investments in many companies  including Figure 1, Mattermark, Wattpad, Uniswap, AngelList, Indochino, Volley and others.

Company history
Version One Ventures was founded in July 2012.

Boris Wertz
Boris Wertz started as an entrepreneur in 1999 founding the German company Just Books. This company was later purchased by Amazon.com in 2008 (a company Wertz couldn't compete with). which spurred Wertz to make the transition from entrepreneur to investor.  He has now been an investor for approximately seven years, and is on the board for the firm Andreessen Horowitz based in Silicon Valley. He has been publicly recognized for his entrepreneurial achievements.

References

Further reading
 

Investment companies of Canada
Financial services companies based in Manitoba
Companies based in Vancouver